Lepista is a genus of moths in the subfamily Arctiinae. The genus was described by Wallengren in 1863.

Species
 Lepista aposema Kühne, 2010
 Lepista arabica Rebel, 1907
 Lepista pandula Boisduval, 1847
 Lepista pulverulenta (T. P. Lucas, 1890)
 Lepista semiochracea Felder, 1874

Former species
 Lepista atrescens Hampson, 1903

References

External links

Lithosiini
Moth genera